Michael Gleeson (born 1955 in Thurles, County Tipperary, Ireland) is an Irish hurling selector and former player.  He is a selector with the Tipperary senior hurling team.

Gleeson enjoyed a decade-long playing career at club level with Thurles Sarsfields and at inter-county level with Tipperary.  He was a corner-back on the latter team in the 1970s, however, he enjoyed little success as Tipp were in the middle of a sharp decline in fortunes.  His inter-county career ended without collecting any silverware.

In retirement from inter-county and club activity, Gleeson became involved in team management.  His coaching career began with the Durlas Óg club in Thurles before later serving as manager during a revival in the fortunes of Thurles Sarsfields at underage and adult levels.  In November 2010 Gleeson was appointed as a selector on the Tipperary senior inter-county team under the management of Declan Ryan.

References

1955 births
Living people
Thurles Sarsfields hurlers
Tipperary inter-county hurlers
Hurling managers